The Death on the High Seas Act (DOHSA) (46 U.S.C. §§ 30301–30308) is a United States admiralty law enacted by the United States Congress. It was originally intended to permit "recovery of damages against a shipowner by a spouse, child or dependent family member of a seaman killed in international waters" in wrongful death cases "caused by negligence or unseaworthiness." It also applies to cases arising out of airline disasters over the high seas that occur beyond the 12-nautical miles of U.S. territorial waters.

Notes

References
Force, Robert; Yiannopoulos, A.N. & Davies, Martin. (2006). Admiralty and Maritime Law [Abridged Edition].  Beard Books. 
 Schaffer, Richard; Agusti, Filiberto &  Earle, Beverley. (2008). International Business Law and Its Environment.  South-Western College/West; 7 edition. .

1920 in American law
United States federal admiralty and maritime legislation